Twenty Girls and the Teachers is a 1971 West German comedy film directed by Werner Jacobs and starring Mascha Gonska, Heidi Kabel, Rudolf Schündler and Fritz Tillmann.

Cast
 Mascha Gonska as Trixie
 Heidi Kabel as Tante Adele
 Rudolf Schündler as Onkel Theobald
 Fritz Tillmann as Studienrat Dr. Birnbaum
 Eva Maria Meineke as Fräulein Brösel
 Ralf Wolter as Studienrat Nager
 Jutta Speidel as Ina
 Gerhart Lippert as Dr. Klaus Höllriegel
 Marion Marlon as Rosi
 Balduin Baas as Dr. Hasenbruch
 Rolf Olsen as Theaterdirektor Klobaster
 Janina Richter as Betty
 Ulrich Beiger as Kultusminister
 Franz Muxeneder as Hausmeister
 Brigitte Mira as Wirtin
 Werner Stock
 Manuela as Manuela
 Albert Bessler as Studienrat Dr. Ernst Höllriegel

References

Bibliography
 Jan Hinnerk Mahler & Carsten Wittmaack. Heidi Kabel: sag ja zum Leben. Militzke, 2004.

External links

1971 films
1971 comedy films
German comedy films
West German films
1970s German-language films
Films directed by Werner Jacobs
Films about educators
Constantin Film films
1970s German films